b Aquarii refers to several different astronomical objects:

 b1 Aquarii or 98 Aquarii
 b2 Aquarii or 99 Aquarii
 b3 Aquarii or 101 Aquarii

Aquarii, b
b Aquarii